Shillinglee is an 18th-century house and estate in West Sussex, England near the Surrey border, in between the villages of Chiddingfold and Plaistow. It is a Grade II* listed building.

It was built in the 18th century and was home to the Earl Winterton who hosted cricket matches within the extensive parkland of the estate.

History

Built in 1735 and revised in the 1770s, Shillinglee was the home of the Earl Winterton and was originally a manor of the Arundel Estate, which belonged to the Norfolk Family. A  landscaped park was laid out in the 1770s with fishponds and tree planting in the style of Capability Brown. The garden and parklands laid out by the 1770s have been changed significantly since. There is little documentary evidence for the design but it is known that in 1766 there were 26 gardeners.

Records exist of 19th-century cricket matches played in the grounds, against neighbouring villages. Both Edward Turnour, 4th Earl Winterton and Edward Turnour, 5th Earl Winterton were first-class cricketers. Around the start of the 20th century, Shillinglee was the summer residence of the Indian Prince Ranjitsinhji, reckoned to be one of the greatest cricketers of all time. He was presumably a guest of the Earl, who at various times was President and Chairman of Sussex CCC.

During the Second World War, the house was occupied by Canadian forces, who accidentally burnt the house down. This was around January 1943 according to a report by a Canadian soldier.

The shell of Shillinglee House has been rebuilt and now consists of private residences. The former grounds once included a public golf course but that has now closed.

Architecture

The red brick two-storey building with attics is of seven bays and a slate roof. The central doorway has rusticated pilasters and segmental pediment.

References

Country houses in West Sussex